This is a list of alcoholic drinks. An alcoholic drink is a drink that contains ethanol, commonly known as alcohol. Alcoholic drinks are divided into three general classes: beers, wines, and distilled beverages. They are legally consumed in most countries, and over one hundred countries have laws regulating their production, sale, and consumption. In particular, such laws specify the minimum age at which a person may legally buy or drink them. This minimum age varies between 15 and 21 years, depending upon the country and the type of drink. Most nations set it at 18 years of age.

Drinks by raw material

The names of some alcoholic drinks are determined by their raw material.

Alcoholic fermented drinks

 Beer
 Ale
 Barleywine
 Bitter ale
 Brown ale
 Cask ale
 Mild ale
 Old ale
 Pale ale
 Scotch ale
 Porter (dark beer made from brown malt)
 Stout (strong Porter)
 Stock ale
 Fruit beer
 Lager
 Pale lager (also "dry beer", made with a slow acting yeast that ferments at a low temperature while being stored)
 Bock (strong lager)
 Maerzen/Oktoberfest Beer
Pilsener (lighter lager brewed with partially malted barley)
 Schwarzbier (dark lager)
 Sahti (Finnish)
 Small beer (very low alcohol)
 Wheat beer (or "Hefeweizen", made with wheat in addition to malted barley)
 Witbier ("White Beer", made with herbs or fruit instead of or in addition to hops)
 Cauim (made from cassava or maize)
 Cheongju (Korean, made from rice)
 Chicha (made from cassava, maize root, grape, apple or other fruits)
 Cider (made from apple juice or other fruit juice)
 Perry (made from pears)
 Plum jerkum (made from plums)
 Desi daru (made by fermenting molasses or high sugar containing fruits)
 Fermented water (made from sugar)
 Kilju (Finnish)
 Huangjiu (made from rice, millet, or wheat using a special starter culture of yeast, mold, and bacteria)
 Icariine liquor
 Kasiri (made from cassava)
 Kumis (Central Asia, traditionally made from horse milk but now primarily cow milk)
 Makgeolli (Korean, made from rice)
 Mead (made from honey)
 Nihamanchi (South America) a.k.a. nijimanche (Ecuador and Peru) (made from cassava)
 Palm wine (made from the sap of various palm trees)
 Parakari (made from cassava)
 Pulque (originally made by the natives of Mexico, made from the sap of the maguey plant)
 Sake (made from (polished) rice)
 Sakurá (made from cassava)
Sato
 Sonti
Tapuy (Philippines, made from glutinous rice)
 Tepache
 Tiswin (made from corn or saguaro, a large cactus)
 Tonto
 Wine
 Coca wine
 Fortified wine
 Port
 Madeira
 Marsala
 Sherry
 Vermouth
 Vinsanto
 Fruit wine
 Table wine
 Sangria
 Sparkling wine
 Champagne

Distilled beverages

Definition
A distilled beverage, spirit drink, or liquor is an alcoholic drink containing ethanol that is produced by distillation (i.e., concentrating by distillation) of ethanol produced by means of fermenting grains, fruits, botanicals, vegetables, seeds, or roots. Vodka, gin, baijiu, shōchū, soju, tequila, rum, whisky, brandy, and singani are examples of distilled drinks. Beer, wine, cider, sake, and huangjiu are examples of fermented drinks.

Hard liquor is used in North America, and India, to distinguish distilled drinks from undistilled ones, and to suggest that undistilled are implicitly weaker.

List of known liquors
The following are liquors being produced around the world (by type, then alphabetically):

Cane sugar/sugar beet/honey distillations
 Arrack
 Cachaça
 Horilka a.k.a. Samohon
 Rum
 Puncheon rum
 Rhum agricole (from French Caribbean islands)

Fruit distillations
 Apple distillations
 Applejack
 Fruit brandy distillations
 Pálenka - Slivovice, Hruškovice, Bezovice,....
 Borovička - Juniper
 Calvados
 Lambig
 Eau-de-vie (French origin)
 Kirsch
 Rakia
 Schnapps - fruit brandy
 Medronho
 Grape/wine distillations
 Brandy
 Armagnac
 Cognac
 Metaxa
 Törkölypálinka
 Singani
 Pisco (Peru; Chile)
 Pear distillations
 Poire Williams
 Williamine - brand of Poire Williams made from Williamine pears
 Plum distillations
 Damassine
 Slivovitz
Ţuică
 Raspberry distillations
Chambord
Himbeergeist

Grain-based distillations
 Barley distillations
Gin
 ManX Spirit (United kingdom)
 London dry gin
Whisky
 Irish whiskey
 Japanese whisky
 Scotch whisky a.k.a. Scottish whiskey, scotch
 Corn distillations
American Whiskey
 Bourbon whiskey a.k.a. Kentucky whiskey, bourbon (United States)
 Tennessee whiskey
 Texas whiskey
 Canadian whisky
 Quinoa distillations
 American whiskey
 Oat distillations
 Whiskey
 American Whiskey
 Malt distillations
Jenever a.k.a. Genever
 Gin
Damson gin
 Sloe gin (England)
 Rice distillations
Awamori (Japan)
 Soju (Korea)
 Mirin (Japan)
 Shōchū (Japan)
 Baijiu (China)
 Rye distillations
 Horilka a.k.a. Samohon
 Rye Whiskey
 Sorghum distillations
 Baijiu a.k.a. Shaojiu (China)
 Maotai a.k.a. Moutai
 Kaoliang liquor a.k.a. Gaoling liquor, sorghum liquor
 Wheat distillations
 Horilka a.k.a. Samohon
Vodka
 Unspecified/multiple grain distillations
 Neutral grain spirit

Herbal distillations
Absinthe
Herbsaint
Schnapps
Geist

Plant-based distillations
 Agave distillations
 Mezcal
 Tequila

Seed or botanical distillations
Where the seed or botanical is the dominant flavorant:
 Anise distillations
 Absinthe
 Akvavit
 Arak
 Rakı
 Coconut flower distillations
 Arrack
 Gin
Geist

Tree distillations
 Palm tree distillations
 Ogogoro (Nigeria)
 Birch tree distillations
 Freya Birch Spirit (Norway)

Vegetable distillations
 Potato distillations
 Horilka a.k.a. Samohon
Vodka

Complex or multiple distillations
Mamajuana
Poitín a.k.a. potcheen, poteen, potheen
Shōchū
Baijiu
Soju

Liqueur

See also

 Alcoholic coffee drink
 List of cocktails
 List of coffee beverages
 List of national drinks
 List of national liquors
 List of tequilas
 List of U.S. state beverages
 List of vodkas
 List of whisky brands

References

Alcoholic beverages
Alcoholic